Qaleh Razeh (also Romanized as Qal‘eh Razeh,  Qal‘eh-i-Riza, Qal‘eh Razah, Qal‘eh Riza, and Qal‘eh-ye Razeh; also known as Razeh) is a village in Hoseyniyeh Rural District, Alvar-e Garmsiri District, Andimeshk County, Khuzestan Province, Iran. At the 2006 census, its population was 527, in 112 families.

References 

Populated places in Andimeshk County